Roman Olegovich Manuylov (born 1 July 1995) is a Russian football player. He plays for FC Arsenal Tula.

Club career
He made his debut in the Russian Second Division for FC Smena Komsomolsk-na-Amure on 5 August 2012 in a game against FC Dynamo Barnaul.
 
He made his Russian Football National League debut for FC Tom Tomsk on 17 March 2018 in a game against FC Tyumen.

References

External links
 

1995 births
People from Komsomolsk-on-Amur
Sportspeople from Khabarovsk Krai
Living people
Russian footballers
Association football defenders
Association football midfielders
FC Smena Komsomolsk-na-Amure players
FC Tom Tomsk players
FC SKA-Khabarovsk players
FC Arsenal Tula players
Russian First League players
Russian Second League players